The Ahmedabad City Police is the primary law enforcement agency and is responsible for law enforcement and public safety in Ahmedabad, the largest city of Indian state of Gujarat. 

It is a subdivision and the part of the state police force of Gujarat. 

The force is headed by a Commissioner. 

It is responsible for the protection and safety of Ahmedabad residents.

Structure 
The police operate from 48 regular police stations. In addition, the Mahila Police Station was established to deal specifically with women's offenses and issues. It functions under the Crime Branch and is headed by a police inspector.

14 traffic police stations deal with traffic-related issues.

Initiatives

Domestic help (Gharghati) online registration 
In the online form for domestic help registration, people employing domestic help are required to supply name, mobile number and temporary as well as permanent addresses of the owner and domestic help. Copies of their documents can be uploaded on the Ahmedabad City Police website.

Help Emergency Alert Rescue Terminal 
HEART is a pilot project launched by Ahmedabad City Police for women's safety. Under this project whenever a woman is assaulted, dialing a toll free number 1091 HEART would alert the police, parents/relatives/friends and provide the victim's location.

Suraksha Setu 
Setu programme aims to provide a friendly face to Gujarat Police.

City urban transport 
Transport initiatives aim for effective street management towards sustainable mobility of vehicular traffic for which DIG Ashok Kumar Yadav received an award on behalf of city police as best city urban transport initiatives at an award function in Nagpur.

Air purifiers 
Looking at the health of traffic police staff deployed near the Pirana dump site, the Ahmedabad police department plans to install outdoor air purifiers at traffic points to provide staff with fresh air.

PUBG ban 
Ahmedabad police commissioner AK Singh issued a notification immediately banning PlayerUnknown's Battlegrounds  [PUBG] and Momo Challenge.

Police Pathshala
The Ahmedabad Traffic Police host 'Police Pathshala' with an aim to bring change in the lives of children living on footpaths.

Commissioners

See also 

 Ahmedabad
 Gujarat Police

References

Official website

 Ahmedabad Police Website - http://www.cpahmedabad.gujarat.gov.in/cpahmedabad/default.aspx
 Twitter - https://twitter.com/AhmedabadPolice
 Facebook - https://facebook.com/AhmedabadPolice
 Website - http://www.ahmedabadcitypolice.org
 Gujarat Police Website - http://www.police.gujarat.gov.in/dgp/default.aspx 

Government of Ahmedabad
Metropolitan law enforcement agencies of India
Year of establishment missing